WSSB-FM (90.3 MHz) is a non-commercial FM radio station in Orangeburg, South Carolina.  It is owned by South Carolina State University, an historically black university.  WSSB-FM carries a jazz radio format and calls itself "South Carolina's Jazz Station."  Students and volunteers present the music, with some syndicated jazz programming coming from National Public Radio and other public broadcasting sources.

WSSB-FM has an effective radiated power (ERP) of 80,000 watts (horizontal polarization) and 72,000 watts (vertical polarization).  The radio studios are on College Street in Orangeburg.

History
The station signed on the air on March 15, 1985.

References

External links

SSB-FM
SSB-FM
Radio stations established in 1985
South Carolina State University
NPR member stations
1985 establishments in South Carolina